Probable low affinity copper uptake protein 2 is a protein that in humans is encoded by the SLC31A2 gene.

See also 
 Solute carrier family

References

Further reading 

 
 

Solute carrier family